Smile is the debut solo album by Wet Wet Wet frontman Marti Pellow. Released on June 25, 2001, the album spawned two singles: "Close to You" (UK #9) and "I've Been Around the World" (UK #28). "Hard to Cry" was also later released as a radio-only promotional single in 2003, having been included on both of Pellow's follow-up albums: Marti Pellow Sings the Hits of Wet Wet Wet & Smile (2002) and Between the Covers (2003).

Production
The album was co-written in its entirety by Squeeze frontman Chris Difford, and was predominantly recorded at Royal Studios in Memphis, alongside frequent collaborator Willie Mitchell, whom Pellow had been friends with since the early days of Wet Wet Wet. Pellow also recorded a number of songs alongside Paul Inder at The Pink Room, which served mainly as B-sides to the album's two singles. "Moment of Truth", co-written by former bandmate Graeme Clark, was one of a number of tracks written for a potential sixth Wet Wet Wet album prior to the break-up of the band in 1999.

During his Pellow Talk tour in 2022, Pellow confirmed that the majority of the album was written as a form of therapy following six months in rehabilitation for alcohol and drug abuse. Stylistically, the album adopts much of the soft-rock/soul style of the latter Wet Wet Wet albums.

Promotion
To promote the album, Pellow made a cameo appearance in Emmerdale, where he performed Close to You in the Woolpack for the departure of Kathy Glover. Pellow also made appearances on Top of the Pops to promote both single releases.

A "complete edition" of the album containing all eight B-sides was released onto streaming services in 2021 to celebrate the twentieth anniversary of the album. These include the first version of Pellow's cover of "The River" by Joni Mitchell, which he would later re-record for his Between the Covers album.

Track listing

References

2001 debut albums
Marti Pellow albums
Mercury Records albums